The Blitzen Benz is a race car built by Benz & Cie in Mannheim, Germany, in 1909. In 1910 an enhanced model broke the world land speed record. It was one of six cars based on the Grand Prix car, but it had an enlarged engine,  inline-four, and improved  aerodynamics.

Of the six Blitzen Benzes ever made, only two survive—Mercedes-Benz owns one, while the other belongs to an American collector.

Burman's record stood until 1919.

After 1914 the car was rebuilt for circuit racing, undergoing a number of revisions before it was broken up in 1923.

References

See also
Land speed record
Motorcycle land-speed record
List of Mercedes-Benz vehicles

Benz vehicles
1900s cars